The 1919 Detroit Stars baseball team competed in Negro league baseball during the 1919 baseball season.  In their first year of competition, the Stars won the championship of independent western Negro league clubs. While the Seamhead website reports that the team compiled a record of 27–13, the "Game Log" below includes 44 wins based on 1919 games for which contemporaneous newspaper accounts have been located.

The Stars played their home games at Mack Park in Detroit with a handful of games also played at Navin Field. The team was owned by Tenny Blount and led by player-manager Pete Hill who compiled a .396 batting average and .892 slugging percentage.

Key personnel

Ownership
The team was established in 1919 by owner Tenny Blount (1873–1934), sometimes also known as "Teddy" Blount, with assistance from Rube Foster who owned the Chicago American Giants. Blount was an Alabama native who moved to Detroit in 1913 and became a prominent "numbers man".

Hall of Fame inductees
Three players from the 1919 Stars were later inducted into the Baseball Hall of Fame:
 Pete Hill was the team's manager, center fielder, and leading batter. During the 1919 season, Hill compiled a .396 batting average with a .488 on-base percentage and an .892 slugging percentage. By late July, he had already hit 16 home runs leading the press to describe him as a rival of Babe Ruth for 1919 slugging honors. (In 1919, Hill's batting average was 74 points higher than Ruth, and his slugging percentage was 235 points higher than Ruth.) Hill was inducted into the Baseball Hall of Fame in 2006 by vote of the Negro League Committee.
 Oscar Charleston also joined the Stars late in the season.  He was a left-handed slugger and played center field for the Stars. He died in 1954 and was inducted into the Baseball Hall of Fame in 1976.
 José Méndez, a native of Cárdenas, Cuba, was the team's shortstop and also appeared in 12 games as a pitcher, compiling a 2.14 earned run average.  Nicknamed "The Black Diamond", Méndez died in 1928 and was posthumously inducted into the Baseball Hall of Fame in 2006.

Other batters
In addition to the three Hall of Fame inductees, the Stars received strong performances from several other position players.

First baseman Edgar Wesley, a left-handed hitter from Texas, compiled a .322 batting average and a .610 slugging percentage for the 1919 Stars. In 146 at bats, he tallied eight home runs, 21 extra-base hits, and 43 RBIs.

Joe Hewitt, an infielder from Alabama, led the team with 153 at bats and ranked second with 36 runs scored and third with 36 hits.

Second baseman Frank Warfield, a Kentucky native, led the team with eight triples.

Pitchers
Sam Crawford were the team's leading pitcher, compiling a 10–4 record and 2.89 earned run average (ERA).

John Donaldson also pitched for the stars, compiling a 2.33 ERA. Donaldson was regarded as one of the greatest pitchers of the era, appearing in approximately 700 games with over 400 wins and 5,000 strikeouts. He was voted a first-team member of the 1952 Pittsburgh Courier player-voted poll of the Negro leagues best players ever.

Season overview
During April and May, the Stars opened the season with a 13-game win streak, including victories over all-white semipro teams. In late May, an all-white team from Wyandotte, Michigan recruited Detroit Tigers pitcher Rudy Kallio to start a game against the Stars; the Stars scored eight runs off Kallio. The local semipro champion, the Maxwells, lost two games to the Stars in the first half of the season, then recruited major league pitcher Ralph Comstock to start a July 13 games against the Stars. With Comstock pitching a strong game for the Maxwells, the Stars lost their first game to a white team by a 4–3 score. The Stars played a total of six games with the Maxwells in 1919, winning three games and losing two.

The Stars' principal rivalry for the western championship of Negro league baseball came from Rube Foster's Chicago American Giants. The Giants won two of three in a series played in Chicago in June. When the teams met for a series in Detroit in early July, the Stars won three games. The also played a seven-game seriesin late July and early August that was billed as the championship series. The Stars won five games to take the championship.

As noted in the "Game Log" below, the Stars also played multiple series with other Negro League teams, including the Cuban Stars, Dayton Marcos from Ohio, and the Hilldale Club from Pennsylvania.

In the last game of the season, the Murray All Stars recruited Detroit Tigers pitcher Bernie Boland; Boland held the Stars scoreless.

Roster

Statistics 
The following batting and pitching statistics are drawn from the Seamheads web site which appear to be incomplete.

Batting 
Note: Pos = Position; G = Games played; AB = At bats; H = Hits; Avg. = Batting average; HR = Home runs; SLG = Slugging percentage

Pitching 
Note: G = Games; IP = Innings pitched; W = Wins; L = Losses; PCT = Win percentage; ERA = Earned run average; SO = Strikeouts

Game log

References

1919 in sports in Michigan
Negro league baseball seasons
African-American history in Detroit